In the Hindu epic Mahabharata, Kichaka or Keechaka is the commander-in-chief of Matsya kingdom, the country ruled by King Virata. He was the younger brother of Sudeshna, the queen of Virata. Kichaka was a very powerful man and had immense strength. He saved Virata's kingdom many times from foes. He was killed by Bhima because he was harassing Draupadi and received a punishment.

Legend

The year of incognito

Draupadi, the wife of the Pandavas when she was disguised as a Sairandhri (female servant) in King Virata's palace for one year. Kichaka once saw Malini and madly desired to enjoy her beauty, but she refused. Kichaka mentioned his lust for Malini to Queen Sudeshna and requested to send her to serve wine for him. While sairandhri was serving the wine, Kichaka meets sairandhri and tried to embrace her. Sairandhri cried and pushed him down. Draupadi, alias Malini, was then pursued by Kichaka to the throne room, where she was seized by hair, brought down to the ground and kicked before a full assembly of courtiers, including her disguised husband Yudhishthira (who was Kanka at that time) and King Virata. Neither Yudhishthira nor King Virata could react because Kichaka wielded so much power within the kingdom. Bhima, gnashing his teeth in rage, was commanded to take revenge by Yudhishthira.

Seething from the public insult, Draupadi consulted Yudhishthira's brother, Bhima, at night, who was disguised as the palace cook. Together, they hatched a plan wherein Draupadi, who would again be disguised as Malini, would pretend to seduce Kichaka in order to arrange a rendezvous in the dance hall after dark. When Kichaka arrived in the dance hall, he saw, much to his pleasure, whom he thought to be a sleeping Malini, as in the dark he couldn't recognize him. As Kichaka advanced forward, however, the person who he thought to be Malini revealed himself as Bhima and a fight occurs in which he brutally kills Kichaka with his bare hands, leaving the corpse almost unrecognizable.

Malini then alarmed the keepers to behold lifeless Kichaka, slain by her husband's Gandharva. Kichakas relatives addressed the King, 'Since it was for her sake that Kichaka lost his life, let her be cremated alongside him'. Then Kichakas people turned upon her, seizing Malini violently, binding and placing her upon the bier, as they set out towards the cemetery. Malini, while being carried, cried out for protection from her husband, Yudhishthira. Bhima, upon hearing these sorrowful words, without losing a moment, quickly changed his attire, hurried out of the palace in the fastest way possible (through a wrong egress, as he knew a shortcut), scaling a wall via a tree. Bhima reaching the funeral pyre, uprooted a large tree and rushed towards those Sutas. And beholding him approaching them, they set Draupadi free and ran towards the city. Meanwhile, he despatched, by means of that tree, hundred and five of them unto the abode of Yama. The citizens of that city inform King Virata. Virata filled with fear, welcomes Draupadi. At the terrible feat of the slaughter of Kichaka, King Duryodhana spies after searching informed him about Virata's kingdom.

Location
Some believe that the village named Ekachakra, or Kaiwara where the Pandavas finally settled after the escape from the murder-attempt, belonged to the kingdom of Kichaka. It is mentioned that the city named Vetrakiya (a city on the banks of river Vetravati, the modern-day river Betwa) was the capital of this kingdom. Vetravati is believed to be the same as the river Suktimati on the banks of which lay the Chedi capital Suktimati. It is a tributary of Yamuna to the east of Charmanvati, yet another tributary of Yamuna. The Kingdom of Kichaka is identified to be lying between Charmanwati and Vetravati rivers, i.e., to the south of southern-Panchala; to the north of Chedi and to the east of Matsya-proper.

Also in the Amravati District situated in the State of Maharashtra, there is a place named Chikhaldara. It is somewhat like a Hill Station to the nearby region because of its exotic scenery and significant altitude. There one finds a waterfall and adjacent to it aboard is installed (probably by the Maharashtra Tourism Development Board) which says that Bhima had killed Kichaka at that spot and upon throwing his body in the deep waterfall, had washed his blood filled hands in the water flowing through the creek. And because of this, the place had derived its name as 'Kichakdhara' and with the passing of time, it became as present days 'Chikhaldara'.
Also, some proof was also found of the same in a location near Virata Nagar near Alwar in Rajasthan State where Pandavas lived during Agyatwas.

References

Characters in the Mahabharata